Lobispa is a genus of leaf beetles consisting of three species from Central America and northern South America. It is classified within the tribe Cubispini, which is placed within the subfamily Eumolpinae. The genus superficially resembles the subfamily Hispinae (now included in Cassidinae).

The genus name comes from lobus (Greek for "an elongated projection") plus -ispa from the subfamily name Hispinae.

Species
There are three species included in Lobispa:
 Lobispa callosa (Baly, 1885) – distributed from Costa Rica to Colombia
 Lobispa expansa Staines, 2001 – distributed from Panama to Venezuela
 Lobispa sentus Staines, 2001 – distributed from Costa Rica to Panama

References

Eumolpinae
Chrysomelidae genera
Beetles of Central America
Beetles of South America